Keasel Broome (born 18 September 1991) is a Barbadian footballer who plays as a goalkeeper for National Premier Soccer League club Pittsburgh Hotspurs and the Barbadian national team.

Career

College
Prior to attending Providence College, played with Caravel Academy, and helped the Academy to the state soccer title in 2009. In 2014 Broome played every minute of every game for the Providence Friars, securing a 2–1 win over Xavier in the Big East title game and subsequent NCAA triumphs over Dartmouth, Cal-Irvine, and Michigan State.

Professional
Broome was selected in the 3rd Round of the 2015 MLS SuperDraft by the San Jose Earthquakes but was ultimately not signed.

On April 1, 2015 Broome signed with NASL club New York Cosmos.

“I’m thrilled about this opportunity to join the Cosmos,” said Broome. “Having just finished college this is a really exciting development in my career, being signed to a world-famous club with a talented squad.”

“Broome is a young player with a lot of potential,” said Cosmos head coach Giovanni Savarese. “He travelled with us during our preseason tour and we were impressed by what we saw during training. He has a great attitude and will fit in well here at the Cosmos.”

International career
Broome became a citizen in Barbados in 2004 and was eligible through his Barbadian father. Broome was called up by the Barbados national football team for the first time in March 2015 but was unable to accept due to injury. He was called up again in June 2015 for Barbados's 2018 World Cup qualification matches against Aruba. Broome made his international debut in the first leg of the qualification series on 10 June 2015, posting a shutout as Barbados won 2–0.

International career statistics

References

External links
 
 Caribbean Football Database profile
 NY Cosmos Profile
 Providence Friars Profile
 

1991 births
Living people
People from Claymont, Delaware
American soccer players
People with acquired Barbadian citizenship
Barbadian footballers
Barbados international footballers
Providence Friars men's soccer players
Reading United A.C. players
Ocean City Nor'easters players
Real Boston Rams players
New York Cosmos (2010) players
Penn FC players
Association football goalkeepers
Soccer players from Delaware
San Jose Earthquakes draft picks
USL League Two players
USL Championship players
National Premier Soccer League players
Pittsburgh Riverhounds SC players
American people of Barbadian descent
Sportspeople of Barbadian descent